Bernat Guiu Vilanova (born 20 September 2000) is a Spanish professional footballer who plays as a forward for Italian  club Pergolettese.

Club career
Born in Falset, Guiu started his career in Gimnàstic de Tarragona youth system, and farm team Pobla de Mafumet, on Tercera División. He made his debut for Tarragona and Segunda División B on 2 February 2020 against Ebro. On 4 July 2021, he left the club.

On 29 July 2021, he joined Italian Serie C club Pergolettese.

References

External links
 
 
 

2000 births
Living people
Sportspeople from the Province of Tarragona
Footballers from Catalonia
Spanish footballers
Association football forwards
Segunda División B players
Tercera División players
CF Pobla de Mafumet footballers
Gimnàstic de Tarragona footballers
Serie C players
U.S. Pergolettese 1932 players
Spanish expatriate footballers
Spanish expatriate sportspeople in Italy
Expatriate footballers in Italy